Hugh Armstrong (3 June 1944 – 26 January 2016) was a British stage, television and film actor. He is best known for his portrayal of the monster in the 1972 cult British horror movie, Death Line, and as Harry Wax in How to Get Ahead in Advertising, acting alongside Richard E. Grant. His obituary, written in the magazine of his old school by Clive Akass, stated that 'life was Hugh's theatre.  He was a travelling entertainment and until the illness that marred his later years, and sometimes even then, he brought laughter wherever he went'.

Life
Armstrong was born in 1944 and educated in Bedford at Bedford Modern School. After a brief spell in the army he decided to take up acting, initially training at the Rose Bruford drama school.

Armstrong's first major role was as Ted the chauffeur in the 1968 film Prudence and the Pill, starring David Niven and Deborah Kerr. His next major role was playing the monster in Death Line alongside Donald Pleasence and Christopher Lee; his performance was said to have achieved the impossible by making a 'grotesque violent cannibal seem pitiful and sympathetic'.

Following his role in the 1972 film, Eagle in a Cage, Armstrong spent many years travelling the world, spending several years in India. He formed a theatre company at the Pune ashram of Bhagwan Shree Rajneesh and under his direction the company toured India, at one point performing before Indira Gandhi. As a member of the Rajneesh movement he left India for the United States, but left before the movement's scandalous collapse in Oregon.

Armstrong returned to the UK to work in film and television productions. He appeared as Jun Priest in the 1982 film, The Beastmaster, and played Harry Wax in How to Get Ahead in Advertising alongside Richard E. Grant. He took part in a number of television series throughout the 1990s and his final role was in the 2007 TV movie, Stuart: A Life Backwards.

In addition to his work in film and television, Armstrong was a member of the Royal Shakespeare Company and later the National Theatre. In 1975 he played R.P. McMurphy in One Flew Over The Cuckoo's Nest at the Everyman Theatre in Liverpool alongside Bill Nighy and Julie Walters.

Armstrong died on 26 January 2016. In the magazine of Armstrong's old school, Clive Akass wrote: 'Life was Hugh's theatre. He was a travelling entertainment and until the illness that marred his later years, and sometimes even then, he brought laughter wherever he went'.

Filmography

Film

Television

References

External links
 

1944 births
2016 deaths
English male film actors
English male stage actors
People from Retford
English male television actors
People educated at Bedford Modern School